Al Irwin (born March 16, 1943) is a former award-winning Canadian Football League player.

A graduate of McMaster University, Irwin joined the Montreal Alouettes in 1964. Catching 11 passes for 156 yards and 2 touchdowns, he won the Gruen Trophy as the best rookie in the east (this during a time when only Canadians could win the award.) He played another season with the Als, catching only 2 passes for 25 yards, and then went on to a 3-year stay with the Toronto Argonauts. As a Double Blue he hauled in 54 passes for 1162 yards and 8 touchdowns. He played one season with the Edmonton Eskimos (26 catches for 445 yards) and a final season with the Hamilton Tiger-Cats (5 catches for 87 yards and 1 touchdown.)

References

1943 births
Living people
Canadian Football League Rookie of the Year Award winners
Canadian football wide receivers
Edmonton Elks players
McMaster Marauders football players
Hamilton Tiger-Cats players
Montreal Alouettes players
Players of Canadian football from Ontario
Canadian football people from Toronto
Toronto Argonauts players